The Let-Mont Piper UL is a Czech microlight aircraft that was designed and produced by Let-Mont sro of Vikýřovice. When it was available the aircraft was supplied as a complete ready-to-fly-aircraft or a kit for amateur construction.

Design and development
It was also marketed in the United States as a kit only for the US homebuilt category.

The Piper UL is based on early Piper Aircraft designs, such as the Piper PA-15 Vagabond, which it resembles. It features a strut-braced high-wing, a two-seats-in-side-by-side configuration enclosed cockpit accessed via doors, fixed conventional landing gear with wheel pants and a single engine in tractor configuration.

The aircraft fuselage is made from welded steel tubing, with the whole aircraft covered in doped aircraft fabric. The standard engine used is the  Rotax 503 two-stroke powerplant.

The manufacturer estimated the construction time from the supplied kit as 800 hours.

Operational history
By 1998 the company reported that 25 aircraft were completed and flying.

In September 2014 no examples were registered in the United States with the Federal Aviation Administration.

Specifications (Piper UL)

References

External links

Piper UL
1990s Czech and Czechoslovakian sport aircraft
1990s Czech and Czechoslovakian ultralight aircraft
1990s Czech and Czechoslovakian civil utility aircraft
Single-engined tractor aircraft
High-wing aircraft
Homebuilt aircraft